James Morris  (1864 in England – 16 July 1915) was a Welsh male international footballer midfielder. He was part of the Wales national team, earning one cap in a match against Scotland on 21 March 1887.

See also
 List of Wales international footballers (alphabetical)
 List of Wales international footballers born outside Wales

References

1864 births
Welsh footballers
Wales international footballers
Association football midfielders
Place of birth missing
1915 deaths